Arnold Lee "Arnie" Betton (July 28, 1929 – November 19, 2009) was an American track and field athlete, known primarily for the high jump. He was an American competitor at the 1952 Olympics, where he finished in seventh position. In the qualifying round, he had been tied as the leading qualifier. In 1951 he was ranked #6 in the world. In 1952, he was ranked 7th, same as his place in the Olympics.

References

External links
 

1929 births
2009 deaths
American male high jumpers
Olympic track and field athletes of the United States
Athletes (track and field) at the 1952 Summer Olympics